Edward Herbert (c. 1513 – 30 April 1593), of Chirbury, Shropshire, England and Montgomery, Wales was a politician.

He was a Member (MP) of the Parliament of England for Montgomeryshire in March 1553, October 1553, April 1554, November 1554, 1558, 1559, 1563, 1571 and 1589.

References

1510s births
1593 deaths
16th-century Welsh politicians
People from Montgomeryshire
Politicians from Shropshire
Members of the Parliament of England (pre-1707) for constituencies in Wales
English MPs 1553 (Edward VI)
English MPs 1553 (Mary I)
English MPs 1554
English MPs 1554–1555
English MPs 1558
English MPs 1559
English MPs 1563–1567
English MPs 1571
English MPs 1589